Leggeri is an Italian surname. Notable people with the surname include:

Fabrice Leggeri (born 1968), French business director
Manuela Leggeri (born 1976), Italian volleyball player
Massimo Andrea Leggeri (born 1950), Italian diplomat 

Italian-language surnames